The Paleontological Site of Agua Negra is located in the Agua Negra in the city of São Martinho da Serra, Rio Grande do Sul, Brazil. The site is approximately 8 kilometers from the city of  Santa Maria. The site belongs to the region paleorrota. Here the Unaysaurus was found .

See also 
 Paleorrota
 Paleontology

Paleontological sites of Brazil
Historical geology
Mesozoic paleontological sites of South America
Triassic paleontological sites